This is a list of members of the Grand Ducal Family of Luxembourg who bear or have borne the title "Princess of Luxembourg". The title is typically born by daughters and some male line granddaughters of the grand dukes and grand duchesses of Luxembourg and spouses of princes of Luxembourg whose marriages have been dynastically approved.

Princesses of Luxembourg are also princesses of Nassau, and male line descendants of Prince Félix are princesses of Bourbon-Parma.

Traditionally, princesses bore the style of Grand Ducal Highness, but since Grand Duchess Charlotte's marriage to Prince Félix of Bourbon-Parma, all of their male line descendants have been styled as Royal Highness.

Princesses of Luxembourg by birth

Princesses of Luxembourg by marriage

See also
 Monarchy of Luxembourg
 List of princes of Luxembourg

References

Luxembourgish monarchy
Lists of Luxembourgian women
House of Luxembourg-Nassau
House of Nassau
House of Bourbon